North Mississippi Allstars is an American blues and southern rock band from Hernando, Mississippi, founded in 1996. The band is currently composed of brothers Luther Dickinson (guitar, lowebow, vocals) and Cody Dickinson (drums, keyboards, electric washboard, vocals). Their most recent album Set Sail was released in 2022.

History
The group was formed in 1996 by brothers Luther and Cody Dickinson (sons of Memphis musician/producer Jim Dickinson), along with bassist Chris Chew, with the intention of combining the blues and bluegrass of the North Mississippi region with rock and other modern forms. Their first album Shake Hands with Shorty was nominated for a Grammy Award for Best Contemporary Blues Album. Their later albums 51 Phantom and Electric Blue Watermelon have received nominations in the same category. The group also won a Blues Music Award for Best New Artist Debut in 2001.

Starting in 2000, the Dickinson brothers and Chew have also participated in supergroup The Word with Robert Randolph and John Medeski. The band made its network television debut in 2000 on Late Night with Conan O'Brien and served as the house band on the program Last Call with Carson Daly for a short period in 2004. Guitarist Duwayne Burnside, son of Mississippi blues musician R. L. Burnside, has often collaborated with the group, and was added as an official member in 2003-2004. The band backed John Hiatt on the album Master of Disaster and the associated tour in 2005.

North Mississippi Allstars albums are known for featuring many guest stars; for example, their 2005 album Electric Blue Watermelon included guest appearances by Lucinda Williams, Robert Randolph, the Dirty Dozen Brass Band, and traditional musician Otha Turner. Luther Dickinson joined the Black Crowes in 2007 and devoted time to both bands until 2011; he appeared on three Black Crowes studio albums. During that period, Cody Dickinson and Chris Chew formed the side project Hill Country Revue. 

Chew left the band in 2015. Since then, the Dickinson brothers have led the group with a rotating cast of supporting musicians. Their 2017 album Prayer for Peace reached number one on the Billboard Blues Albums Chart. Their 2019 album Up and Rolling was selected as a "Favorite Blues Album" by AllMusic.

Members
Current members
 Luther Dickinson – guitar, vocals, cigar box guitar, drums, bass (1996–present)
 Cody Dickinson – drums, percussion, vocals, guitar, synthesizer (1996–present)
Former members
 Chris Chew – bass, vocals (1996–2015)
 Duwayne Burnside – guitar, vocals (2003–2004)

Timeline

Discography

Albums 
Shake Hands with Shorty (2000)
51 Phantom (2001)
Polaris (2003)
Tate County Hill Country Blues (2003, Private Release)
Hill Country Revue - Live at Bonnaroo (2004, live)
Electric Blue Watermelon (2005)
Paradise Boston, Ma 11.12.05 (2006, Instant Live)
Keep On Marchin': Live in Burlington, VT 11.11.05 (2007, 2 CDs live)
Mississippi Folk Music - Volume One (2007)
Hernando (2008)
Do It Like We Used to Do (2009, 2 CDs and DVD live set)
Boulderado: Live at the Fox (2010, 2 CDs live)
Live in the Hills 6.26.10 (2010, official live bootleg as North Mississippi Allstars Duo)
Keys to the Kingdom (2011)
Live In The Hills II 6.24.11 (2011, official live bootleg)
World Boogie Is Coming (2013)
Freedom & Dreams with Anders Osborne (2015)
Prayer for Peace (2017)
Up and Rolling (2019)
Set Sail (featuring Lamar Williams Jr.) (2022)

EPs 
Shimmy She Wobble (2000)
Instores & Outtakes (2004)
Electric Blue Watermelon Screwed and Chopped EP (2005)
Upstairs At United, Vol. 4 (2012, live)

Awards and nominations 

!
|-
|align=center|2020
|rowspan="2"| Up and Rolling
| Grammy Award for Best Contemporary Blues Album
|
| 
|-
|align=center|2020
|rowspan="2"| Blues Music Award for Blues Rock Album
|
|rowspan="3"| 
|-
|rowspan="2"| 2018
|Prayer for Peace
|
|-
|North Mississippi Allstars
| Blues Music Award for Band of the Year
|
|-
|align=center|2005
|Electric Blue Watermelon
|rowspan="2"| Grammy Award for Best Contemporary Blues Album
|
|rowspan="2"| 
|-
|align=center|2002
|51 Phantom
|
|-
|align=center|2001
|rowspan="2"| Shake Hands with Shorty
| Blues Music Awards for Best New Artist Debut
|
| 
|-
|align=center|2000
| Grammy Award for Best Contemporary Blues Album
|
| 
|-

References

External links
 
 
 Zebra Ranch studio
 Hill Country Revue Official Website
 North Mississippi Allstars collection at the Internet Archive's live music archive

American blues musical groups
American blues rock musical groups
Jam bands
Musical groups established in 1996
Rock music groups from Mississippi
American southern rock musical groups
Hernando, Mississippi
ATO Records artists
Artemis Records artists
New West Records artists